Pennsylvania's first congressional district includes all of Bucks County and a sliver of Montgomery County in southeastern Pennsylvania. It has been represented by Brian Fitzpatrick since 2019.

The state congressional district map was redrawn by the Supreme Court of Pennsylvania in February 2018 after ruling the previous map unconstitutional due to partisan gerrymandering; the previous 1st district was geographically succeeded by the newly redrawn 2nd district which on November 6, 2018, elected Brendan Boyle, the incumbent from the 13th district. The new first district is similar to the previous eighth district, with the new boundaries going into effect for the 2018 elections and representation thereafter.

Fitzpatrick, the incumbent from the previous 8th district, was elected on November 6, 2018, to the newly redrawn 1st district. Only minor changes were made to the district after redistricting following the 2020 census. It was one of 18 districts that voted for Joe Biden in the 2020 presidential election while being won or held by a Republican in 2022.

List of members representing the district 
The district was organized from Pennsylvania's at-large congressional district in 1791.

1791–1793: One seat

1795–1803: One seat

The district was organized from Pennsylvania's At-large congressional district in 1795.

1803–1823: Three seats, then four
The district was reorganized in 1803 to have 3 At-large seats on a general ticket. The district was apportioned a fourth seat in 1813, also elected on a general ticket.

1823–present: One seat

The district was reorganized in 1823 to have one seat.

Recent election results

2012

2014

2016

2018

2020

2022

See also

List of United States congressional districts
Pennsylvania's congressional districts

References

 Congressional Biographical Directory of the United States 1774–present

External links
Congressional redistricting in Pennsylvania

01
Constituencies established in 1791
1791 establishments in Pennsylvania
Constituencies disestablished in 1793
1793 disestablishments in Pennsylvania
Constituencies established in 1795
1795 establishments in Pennsylvania